The Glasgow Exhibition Cup was a football competition held as part of the Glasgow International Trade Fair of 1901.

Eight Scottish First Division sides (acknowledged as the leading clubs in the country) were invited to the tournament, and matches were played at a specially built site at Gilmorehill, located adjacent to the University of Glasgow and near to the Kelvingrove Art Gallery where the main part of the exhibition was being held. Played across August and early September 1901, Rangers won the competition, defeating Celtic in the final – a cup and gold medals were awarded to the winning team.

The following year the 1902 Ibrox disaster occurred, and Rangers organised a tournament with its proceeds going to benefit the victims, offering up the Exhibition Cup as a prize for the winners. Celtic won that tournament, the British League Cup (beating Rangers in the final), and kept the trophy permanently, despite its inscription stating "Awarded to Rangers F.C."

Matches

Quarter-finals

Semi-finals

Final

Teams

See also
1888 Glasgow Exhibition Cup, similar tournament in 1888 at the same venue
Edinburgh Exhibition Cup, similar tournament in 1908
Empire Exhibition Trophy, similar tournament in 1938 (also featuring English clubs)
Saint Mungo Cup, similar tournament in 1951
Coronation Cup (football), similar tournament in 1953 (also featuring English clubs)

References

Defunct football cup competitions in Scotland
Scottish football friendly trophies
1901–02 in Scottish football